Podoctidae is a family of the harvestman infraorder Grassatores with about 130 described species.

Description
Body length ranges from 2.5 to 5 millimeters, with leg length ranging from three to almost thirty mm. While most species are brown to yellow, some are deep green. The legs may be ringed in black and yellow. The penis is uniquely built.

Distribution
Most species occur in Southeast Asia, especially in New Guinea. Others are found in Melanesia, Micronesia, Japan, India and Sri Lanka, Madagascar, the Seychelles and Mauritius, and central Africa. Ibantila cubana was introduced in a botanical garden in Cuba. Although one Podoctidae was described from Brazil in 1938, it was later transferred to Triaenonychidae. The oldest known member of the family is Burmalomanius from the mid-Cretaceous Burmese amber of Myanmar.

Relationships
Although Podoctidae are currently included in Samooidea, and are surely Grassatores, there is no obvious relationship with any family.

Name
The name of the type genus is derived from Ancient Greek podos "foot" and oktis "spine", referring to the ventral row of long spines in femur I.

Genera

Erecananinae
 Erecanana Strand, 1911 — Africa, Madagascar, Réunion (9 species)
 Iyonus Suzuki, 1964 — Japan (1 species)
 Lomanius Roewer, 1923 — Java, Palau, Taiwan (8 species)

Ibaloniinae
 Asproleria Roewer, 1949 — New Guinea (1 species)
 Austribalonius Forster, 1955 — Australia (1 species)
 Bonea Roewer, 1913 — Indonesia, Philippines (8 species)
 Eusitalces Roewer, 1915 — Sri Lanka (1 species)
 Gargenna Roewer, 1949 — Indonesia (1 species)
 Heteroibalonius Goodnight & Goodnight, 1947 (1 species)
 Heteropodoctis Roewer, 1912 — New Guinea (1 species)
 Holozoster Loman, 1902 — Seychelles (1 species)
 Ibalonianus Roewer, 1923 — New Guinea, Indonesia, Solomons (7 species)
 Ibalonius Karsch, 1880 — Philippines, New Caledonia, Seychelles, New Guinea (17 species)
 Ibantila Silhavy, 1969 — Cuba (introduced) (1 species)
 Leytpodoctis J. Martens, 1993 - Philippines (1 species)
 Mesoceratula Roewer, 1949 (1 species)
 Metibalonius Roewer, 1915 — New Guinea, Indonesia (17 species)
 Orobunus Goodnight & Goodnight, 1947 (1 species)
 Paramesoceras Roewer, 1915 — New Guinea (1 species)
 Pentacros Roewer, 1949 — Indonesia (1 species)
 Podoctinus Roewer, 1923 — New Britain (1 species)
 Proholozoster Roewer, 1915 — New Guinea (1 species)
 Santobius Roewer, 1949 — New Hebrides (1 species)
 Sitalcicus Roewer, 1923 — Seychelles (3 species)

Podoctinae
 Baramella Roewer, 1949 — Borneo (1 species)
 Baramia Hirst, 1912 — Indonesia (4 species)
 Baso Roewer, 1923 — Sumatra (1 species)
 Basoides Roewer, 1949 — Sumatra (1 species)
 Bistota Roewer, 1927 — India (1 species)
 Centrobunus Loman, 1902 — Seychelles (1 species)
 Dino Loman, in Weber 1892 — Sumatra (1 species)
 Dongmoa Roewer, 1927 — Tonking (2 species)
 Eupodoctis Roewer, 1923 — India, Sri Lanka (2 species)
 Eurytromma Roewer, 1949 — Sri Lanka (1 species)
 Gaditusa Roewer, 1949 — Borneo (1 species)
 Hoplodino Roewer, 1915 — Indonesia, Singapore (4 species)
 Idjena Roewer, 1927 — Java (1 species)
 Idzubius Roewer, 1949 — Japan (1 species)
 Japetus Roewer, 1949 — Borneo (1 species)
 Laponcea Roewer, 1936 — Mauritius (1 species)
 Lejokus Roewer, 1949 — Borneo (1 species)
 Lundulla Roewer, 1927 — Borneo (1 species)
 Metapodoctis Roewer, 1915 — Taiwan, Thailand (2 species)
 Neopodoctis Roewer, 1912 — Sri Lanka (2 species)
 Oppodoctis Roewer, 1927 — Philippines (1 species)
 Peromona Roewer, 1949 — Seychelles (1 species)
 Podoctellus Roewer, 1949 — Johore (1 species)
 Podoctis Thorell, 1890 — Pinang (1 species)
 Podoctomma Roewer, 1949 — Java (1 species)
 Podoctops Roewer, 1949 — Sumatra (1 species)
 Pumbaraius Roewer, 1927 — India (2 species)
 Sibolgia Roewer, 1923 — Sumatra (1 species)
 Stobitus Roewer, 1949 — Malaysia (1 species)
 Tandikudius Roewer, 1929 — India (1 species)
 Trencona Roewer, 1949 — Borneo (1 species)
 Trigonobunus Loman, 1894 — Borneo (1 species)
 Tryssetus Roewer, 1936 — Mauritius (1 species)
 Vandaravua Roewer, 1929 — India (1 species)

Footnotes

References
 's Biology Catalog: Podoctidae
  (eds.) (2007): Harvestmen - The Biology of Opiliones. Harvard University Press 

Harvestmen
Harvestman families